The 1978–79 Illinois Fighting Illini men's basketball team represented the University of Illinois.

Regular season
In 1978-79 season, Illinois finished seventh in the Big Ten, but went 19-11 overall, including ascension to No. 2 in the national polls after starting the year 15-0. During this season, Illinois upset top-ranked Michigan State and Magic Johnson, 57-55, in one of the school’s most memorable games. It was during this season that Illinois also led the nation in field-goal percentage defense (.404).

Roster

Source

Schedule
																	
Source																																		
																		
|-																		
!colspan=12 style="background:#DF4E38; color:white;"| Non-Conference regular season
	

|-
!colspan=9 style="background:#DF4E38; color:#FFFFFF;"|Big Ten regular season	

|-

Player stats

Awards and honors
 Eddie Johnson
Fighting Illini All-Century team (2005)
Mark Smith
Team Most Valuable Player

Team players drafted into the NBA

Rankings

References

Illinois Fighting Illini
Illinois Fighting Illini men's basketball seasons
1978 in sports in Illinois
1979 in sports in Illinois